Nottingham is a small town on the Patuxent River in Prince George's County, Maryland, United States. 
It contains an archaeological site which was listed on the National Register of Historic Places in 1975.

Pre-European era
The Nottingham site is an archeological site located on a terrace of the Patuxent River, near Upper Marlboro, Prince George's County, Maryland.  The site contains an important record of more than 5000 years of prehistory, including Middle Archaic (c. 6000 BC) through Late Woodland (AD 1600) materials. Of particular note are a sizable Middle Woodland Selby Bay component, and a large Late Woodland component (c. AD 1550–1600) which may correspond to the village of Mattpament depicted on John Smith's 1608 map.

Colonial settlement
The Bowie family settled in this area during the colonial period, building a number of homes including "Mattaponi".

Benjamin Contee was born in Nottingham.

References

External links
, including photo in 1974, at Maryland Historical Trust website
 M-NCPPC Inventory of Historic Sites (Prince George's County): Archeological Sites; National Archives Archeological Site, entry 82B-025, p. 205

Populated places in Prince George's County, Maryland
Archaic period in North America
Archaeological sites in Prince George's County, Maryland
Archaeological sites on the National Register of Historic Places in Maryland
Native American history of Maryland
Woodland period
National Register of Historic Places in Prince George's County, Maryland